Identity: Action is the third extended play by South Korean boy group WEi. It was released by Oui Entertainment on June 9, 2021 and contains five tracks, including the lead single "Bye Bye Bye".

Background and release 
On May 24, 2021, it was announced the group would release their third extended play Identity: Action on June 9. On June 2, the track list was released, with "Bye Bye Bye" announced as the lead single. The next day, the highlight medley video was released. Music video teasers for the lead single were released on June 5 and June 8, respectively.

Composition 
Identity: Action consists of five tracks and is described as being a bright and refreshing summer album that illuminates the group's growth while also being the last album in the group's Identity trilogy. The lead single "Bye Bye Bye" is a described as refreshing with a cool beat and addictive hook melody which expresses the desire to find your true self by doing what you want to do and escaping from worries and restraints. The second track "White Light" is a modern pop music song that expresses the desire to give everything to the person they love like a white hole in space. The third track "Waitin'" is described as sweet and captivating trendy hip-hop song with trap music rhythm about seducing the one you love while telling them to run away because you're dangerous. The fourth track "Ocean" is described as fast-paced and refreshing atmosphere that uses expressions to compare someone to the sea. The fifth track "RUi" is ballad composed by member Jang Dae-hyeon and described as containing the group's feelings for their fans with the meaning of the fans will be the ones who open the way for the group.

Promotion 
Following the release of Identity: Action, WEi held an online showcase on the same date to introduce the extended play and communicate with their fans. The group performed "Bye Bye Bye", "Waitin'", and "RUi" during the showcase. The group's promotions for the song "Bye Bye Bye" began on June 10, 2021, on Mnet's M Countdown. The B-side track "Waitin'" was also performed during the group's promotions. A special music video featuring "Ocean" was released on July 31 to celebrate the group's 300 day anniversary since debut.

Track listing

Charts

Weekly charts

Monthly charts

Release history

References 

2021 EPs
Korean-language EPs
K-pop EPs